QT interval variability (QTV) refers to the physiological phenomenon of beat-to-beat fluctuations in QT interval of electrocardiograms. Increased QTV appears to be a marker of arrhythmic and cardiovascular death; it may also play a role for noninvasive assessment of sympathetic nervous system activity.

Other terms used include: "QT variability", "beat-to-beat variability of ventricular repolarization (BRV)"

QT interval measurement 
Under normal resting conditions, beat-to-beat changes in QT interval are very small with a standard deviation typically below 5 ms. Digital high resolution ECG sampled at 300 Hz or higher and dedicated computer algorithms are required for QTV assessment. Template-based algorithms that use parts of, or the entire ECG waveform usually deliver good results; template stretching or warping techniques perform comparably well in the presence of noise.

QTV Analysis 
A number of metrics have been proposed for QTV quantification. The QT variability index (QTVi) has been most frequently reported in the literature: 

More advanced approaches that take into account the relationship between QTV and heart rate variability include vector autoregressive process models and information domain approaches.

References 

Cardiac electrophysiology